Toplik is an abandoned village in the municipality of Štip, North Macedonia.

Demographics

The settlement last had inhabitants in the 1961 census, where it was recorded as being populated by 12 Albanians and 11 Macedonians.

According to the 2002 census, the village had 0 inhabitants.

References

Villages in Štip Municipality
Albanian communities in North Macedonia